The 2000–01 Winston YUBA League was the 8th season of the YUBA League, the top-tier professional basketball league in Yugoslavia (later renamed to Serbia and Montenegro).

Teams 
A total of 12 teams participated in the 2000–01 Winston YUBA League.

Distribution
The following is the access list for this season.

Promotion and relegation 
 Teams promoted from the YUBA B League
 Zdravlje
 Sloga Telekom Srbija

 Teams relegated to the YUBA B League
 Spartak
 Ibon

Venues and locations

Personnel and sponsorship

Regular season

Standings

Playoffs

Bracket 
Source

Clubs in European competitions
Source

See also 
 2000–01 Yugoslav Basketball Cup

References

2000–01 in Yugoslav basketball
Serbia